is a railway station on the Ainokaze Toyama Railway Line in the town of Asahi,  Toyama Prefecture, Japan, operated by the third-sector railway operator Ainokaze Toyama Railway.

Lines
Some trains of the Echigo Tokimeki Railway Nihonkai Hisui Line terminate at Etchū-Miyazaki Station rather than neighbouring .

Station layout 
Etchū-Miyazaki Station has one island platform connected by a footbridge. The station is unattended.

Platforms

History
Etchū-Miyazaki Station opened on 20 November 1957 as a station on the Japan National Railways (JNR). It was privatized on 1 April 1984, becoming a station on JR West.

From this date, Etchū-Miyazaki Station was transferred to the ownership of the third-sector operating company Ainokaze Toyama Railway.

Adjacent stations

Passenger statistics
In fiscal 2015, the station was used by an average of 67 passengers daily (boarding passengers only).

Surrounding area 
 
 Miyazaki Fishing Port

See also
 List of railway stations in Japan

References

External links

  

Railway stations in Toyama Prefecture
Railway stations in Japan opened in 1957
Ainokaze Toyama Railway Line
Asahi, Toyama